Richard 'Dick' Johnson (born 26 April 1945) is a part-owner of the V8 Supercar team Dick Johnson Racing and a former racing driver.  As a driver, he was a five-time Australian Touring Car Champion and a three-time winner of the Bathurst 1000. As of 2008 Johnson has claimed over twenty awards and honours, including the V8 Supercars Hall of Fame into which he was inducted in 2001.

In 2009 as part of the Q150 celebrations, Dick Johnson was announced as one of the Q150 Icons of Queensland for his role as a "sports legend".

Early life

As a teen Johnson attended Cavendish Road State High School in Brisbane, Australia and it was in this area of Coorparoo that he first started driving with his father as a young child. Cavendish Road State High School has named one of their school houses Johnson, in his honour. The house colour is blue.

After leaving school, Johnson was drafted into the Australian Army at the age of 20 and began his two-year National Service in 1965. Although they did not know each other at the time, both Johnson and future touring car rival Peter Brock were stationed together at the Blamey Barracks near Wagga Wagga in New South Wales from 1965 to 1967.

Racing

Despite becoming synonymous with driving Fords, Johnson raced in his early days in a succession of Holdens. Johnson's first race car was a Holden FJ, his first race being at Lakeside International Raceway in November 1964. In 1968 and 1969 he raced his Holden EH and from there progressed to a Holden Torana GTR for 1970, scoring his first Australian Touring Car Championship points at Lakeside in that year. The GTR was upgraded to XU-1 specifications in 1971. Johnson's first drive in the Hardie Ferodo 1000 was in Bob Forbes' Holden LJ Torana GTR XU-1 in 1973 when they placed fifth. Johnson then had a single race for the Holden Dealer Team at the Surfers Paradise round of the 1974 ATCC where he finished 3rd driving a GTR XU-1. He later purchased the ex HDT Torana in which Peter Brock had won the Bathurst 1000 in 1972 from Barrie Nixon Smith and campaigned the car until his switch to Ford in 1977. The Torana was sold to Kerry Cox who raced it in the QLD Touring car championship in a close rivalry with Dick, with Cox winning in 1977 and Dick getting the title in 1978.

In 1980, during the Bathurst 1000 he started 2nd and led for the first 17 laps before his car was spun off the track after hitting a football-sized rock that had been, according to an eye-witness in 2012, accidentally kicked onto the track by one of a pair of inebriated men. The resulting public support where people from around Australia rang their local Channel 7 television station (the race broadcaster) and pledged money to help the team get back on its feet. Eventually the sum of A$72,000 was donated to help rebuild the car. Led by its CEO Edsel Ford II who saw the value of the goodwill in the press surrounding Johnson's crash, the Ford Motor Company of Australia provided a new car shell and promised to match the donation dollar for dollar, resulting in the team receiving $144,000 to help get back into racing.

Johnson's close friend Ross Palmer, the owner of Palmer Tube Mills of Brisbane, became his primary sponsor in 1981 (with Bryan Byrt Ford also still a major sponsor), and with the donated money allowed him to return the next year to win both the Australian Touring Car Championship (ATCC) and the Bathurst 1000 (with John French). Johnson won the ATCC in a famous race-long duel with Peter Brock at the Lakeside International Raceway round. He won the ATCC again in 1982 (the Tru Blu XD Falcon), 1984 (Greens Tuff XE Falcon), 1988 (Ford Sierra RS500) and 1989 (Sierra RS500). He also won Bathurst in 1989 (in a Ford Sierra with John Bowe) and 1994 (in an EB Falcon, also with Bowe). The names Tru Blu, and Greens Tuff, as well as Red Roo (seen in late 1982 only), were product names of Palmer Tube Mills.

With much larger budgets required in the racing industry, Ross Palmer helped negotiate for Shell to be the team's primary sponsor from 1987. The larger budget allowed the team to expand from just one car for Dick, to a second Ford Sierra RS Cosworth for his then teammate Gregg Hansford.

NASCAR
In 1989 and 1990, prompted by Palmer Tube Mills who assisted him in receiving multiple sources of sponsorship and through the company's American offshoot Redkote, Johnson made a brief foray into the NASCAR Cup Series driving a Ford Thunderbird, entering a total of seven races with a best start of 11th at Sears Point Raceway in his first race, and a best finish of 22nd at Pocono Raceway. Johnson also drove a Thunderbird in the first NASCAR race held in Australia, the 1988 Goodyear NASCAR 500 at the Calder Park Thunderdome in Melbourne. Unfortunately for Johnson he was involved in an early race crash which put him out of the event.

Retirement
Dick Johnson retired from racing at the end of the 1999 season, though he remains in charge of DJR. He did however make a one-off final appearance in front of his home crowd at the Queensland 500 in 2000 with his son Steven who had taken over driving Dick's famous Number 17 and continued to for over a decade after. Johnson has twice written his autobiography as well as contributing to a third biography.

In 2014, DJR announced that 51% of the team was sold to legendary team owner Roger Penske establishing DJR-Team Penske, which fields two cars in V8 Supercar racing. In 2019 Scott McLaughlin and Alexandre Premat scored Johnson his first Bathurst 1000 win in any capacity since 1994. Penske later sold his share in the team back to Johnson at the end of the 2020 Supercars Championship and the team reverted to Dick Johnson Racing.

Racecam
Johnson's laconic nature and quick wit were put to good use by longtime Bathurst 1000 TV broadcaster Channel 7 when they first put one of their racecam units in his Tru-Blu Ford Falcon for the 1982 James Hardie 1000. Johnson and co-driver John French were also wired for sound so the commentary team could talk to the drivers while racing around the track. From then on Johnson's cars were rarely without a TV camera sitting where the passenger seat usually was, especially when Seven was televising the race. His laconic commentary and a seemingly endless list of one-liners quickly became a favourite with Australian race fans, even those who normally followed Holden drivers such as Peter Brock and Allan Grice, both of whom also became exponents of using racecam.

Some of Johnson's quotes while on racecam were:
 "I've got one black BMW in front of me, one behind me. Frank Gardner and his All Blacks" – 1985 ATCC, Round 5 at the Adelaide International Raceway while he was sandwiched between the black JPS Team BMW's of New Zealanders Jim Richards and Neville Crichton. Gardner was the JPS team manager.
 "The old Volvo must have its truck suspension in" – 1986 ATCC, Round 4 at Adelaide International. Ironically Robbie Francevic's Volvo emerged as the race winner.
 "This race is like the Irishman who won the Tour de France I tell ya. He had to go on a lap of honour" – 1986 James Hardie 1000
 "This is where I lose so much time. I mean, this part of the track is just so boring" – 1986 Bathurst referring to his V8 Ford Mustang's lack of grunt compared to his competitors on the run up Mountain Straight.
 "It's missing and carrying on like an old sheila" – 1988 ATCC, Grand Finale at Oran Park Raceway after turbo boost problems with his championship winning Ford Sierra RS500 saw him relinquish the lead mid-race to teammate John Bowe. With the opposition nowhere in sight, Bowe later slowed enough to allow Dick to win the race and followed him across the line in a 1–2 form finish.
 "Winton? Its like running a marathon around your clothesline" – 1990 ATCC, Round 4 at Winton after Channel 7 commentator Mike Raymond asked him what the definition of Winton was.
 "Then Brock got past me would you believe, unfortunately, and that thing of his like, I nearly choked to death on Mobil 1. It looks like the last train to Ferny Grove" – 1990 ATCC, Grand Finale at Oran Park after problems with the Sierra saw him drop out of race winning and championship contention. He was referring to the Peter Brock Sierra's habit of belching black oil smoke out of its exhaust whenever he lifted off the accelerator.
 "The Sierra on one cylinder has got as much grunt as the Commodore" – 1991 ATCC, Round 5 at Winton after his misfiring Sierra had been passed by the V8 Holden Commodore of Larry Perkins.
 "You've got to be joking" – 1995 ATCC, Round 3 at Bathurst. Channel 7 had just crossed to Johnson with Mike Raymond asking "Are you lonely?". Johnson's quote came just seconds before he spun his Ford EF Falcon into Caltex Chase, seemingly distracted by Raymond's interruption.

Career results

Complete Australian Touring Car Championship results
(key) (Races in bold indicate pole position) (Races in italics indicate fastest lap)

Complete World Touring Car Championship results
(key) (Races in bold indicate pole position) (Races in italics indicate fastest lap)

† Not registered for series & points

Complete World Sportscar Championship results
(key) (Races in bold indicate pole position) (Races in italics indicate fastest lap)

Complete European Touring Car Championship results
(key) (Races in bold indicate pole position) (Races in italics indicate fastest lap)

Complete Asia-Pacific Touring Car Championship results
(key) (Races in bold indicate pole position) (Races in italics indicate fastest lap)

NASCAR
(key) (Bold – Pole position awarded by qualifying time. Italics – Pole position earned by points standings or practice time. * – Most laps led.)

Winston Cup Series

Complete Bathurst 1000 results

References

External links
Dick Johnson Racing official website
Dick Johnson's Elaborated Biography
Racing Reference profile (US stats)
Driver Database profile

1945 births
Australian Touring Car Championship drivers
Bathurst 1000 winners
Living people
NASCAR drivers
Racing drivers from Brisbane
Sportsmen from Queensland
Supercars Championship drivers
World Touring Car Championship drivers
World Sportscar Championship drivers
Australian Endurance Championship drivers
Dick Johnson Racing drivers